Carusu (plural carusi)  is the Sicilian word for "boy" and is derived from the Latin carus which means "dear" In the mid-1800s through the early 1900s in Sicily, carusu was used to denote a "mine-boy", a labourer in a sulfur, salt or potash mine who worked next to a picuneri or pick-man, and carried raw ore from deep in the mine to the surface. As with other mining industries, the use of carusi declined as mines switched to other, more efficient methods of transporting minerals to the surface, and the use of children is said to have ended by the 1920s or 1930s, but teenagers were still employed to carry ore to the surface as late as the 1950s.

Working conditions
 These carusi generally worked in near-slavery, often given up by foundling homes or even by their own families for a succursu di murti (death benefit), which effectively made them the property of either the picuneri or of the owners of the mines. Often "recruited" as young as five to seven years of age, once they were thus encumbered, many lived their whole lives as carusi, and in many cases not only worked, but ate and slept in the mines or nearby. A parent or foundling home official could redeem them by paying back the death benefit, but in the poverty-stricken Sicily of the time, this was a rare occurrence.

The conditions of the carusi were described by two politicians from mainland Italy, Leopoldo Franchetti and Sidney Sonnino who had travelled to Sicily in 1876 to conduct an unofficial inquiry into the state of Sicilian society:

As a result, the minimum age was increased to 10 years by government decree in 1876. In 1905 the minimum age was raised to 14 years and in 1934 to 16. In 1911 it was reported that the law was not rigidly enforced, however.

The horrific conditions in Sicilian sulfur mines prompted Booker T. Washington − himself an African American born a slave – to write in 1910: "I am not prepared just now to say to what extent I believe in a physical hell in the next world, but a sulphur mine in Sicily is about the nearest thing to hell that I expect to see in this life." He had traveled to Europe to acquaint himself, in his words: "with the condition of the poorer and working classes in Europe". As an eyewitness, he described the plight of the carusi as follows:

The British physician Sir Thomas Oliver visited the mines in Lercara Friddi in 1910 as well and described working conditions in the British Medical Journal:

The abysmal working conditions often caused a physical and moral degradation. Illiterates with no schooling, frequently maltreated and with lopsided bodies and misformed knees due to carrying heavy loads. Partial or complete loss of vision was not uncommon among the miners as the result of injuries to the eyes. Sir Oliver was “struck by the short stature and defective development of the men who transport the ore on their shoulders. Some of the men whom I measured, although 30 years of age and upwards, were only 4 ft. high, and in mental development were but as children.” He observed that: “so diminutive in stature are these men, and so deformed physically, that the Government can hardly obtain in a sulphur mining district conscripts for the army.”

The consequences of the inhuman working conditions continued for the rest of the carusu’s life. According to Oliver:

The sulfur-mining town of Lercara Friddi, for instance, was nicknamed the "town of the humpbacks" (u paisi di jmmuruti) by the surrounding municipalities.

In literature and film
 Acla's Descent into Floristella is a 1992 Italian film directed by Aurelio Grimaldi, about a young carusu, horribly abused in the sulfur mines, who tries to run away.
The Hunger Saint (Bordighera Press, 2017) by Olivia Kate Cerrone. Hailed by Kirkus Reviews as "a well-crafted and affecting literary tale," this historical novella follows the journey of Ntoni, a twelve-year-old boy forced to labor in Sicily's sulfur mines to support his family after his father's untimely death. Faced with life-threatening working conditions, Ntoni must choose between escaping the mines and abandoning his family. As a series of unforeseen events soon complicate his plans, Ntoni realizes that all is not what it seems and to trust anyone might prove to be as fatal as being trapped inside of a cave-in. The Hunger Saint draws from years of historical research and was informed by the oral histories of former miners still living in Sicily today.
I Malavoglia (The House by the Medlar-Tree, 1890) by Giovanni Verga, set in Aci Trezza, tells the story of Toscanos, a family of fishers.
 The short stories "Il Fumo" ("Fumes," 1901) and "Ciàula scopre la luna" ("Ciàula discovers the moon," 1912) by Nobel Prize–winning author Luigi Pirandello tell the story of the enslavement of children as beasts of burden in the mines to haul the ore from the depths of the earth.
 The story of one sulfur-mine carusu and his fate is a side theme in the historical novella The Lady of the Wheel by Angelo F. Coniglio.
 The novel Black Mountain (2012) by Australian writer Venero Armanno (University of Queensland Press) depicts in detail the life of a child slave in the Sicilian sulfur mines in the early 1900s.

References

 Kutney, Gerald (2007), Sulfur: History, Technology, Applications & Industry, ChemTec Publishing, 
 Radcliff-Umstead, Douglas (1978), The Mirror of Our Anguish: A Study of Luigi Pirandello's Narrative Writings, Fairleigh Dickinson Univ Press, 
 Washington, Booker T. & Robert Ezra Park (1912), The Man Farthest Down: A Record of Observation and Study in Europe, Transaction Publishers,

External links
 Collected excerpts from an oral history project about the lives of the "carusi," child-aged sulfur miners, who worked at the Floristella Grottacalda mines in Sicily by writer Olivia Kate Cerrone

Culture of Sicily
19th century in Sicily
20th century in Sicily
Sulfur mining
Mining in Italy